Padang Besar (Thai) railway station is a railway station located in Padang Besar Subdistrict, Sadao District, Songkhla. It is a class 1 railway station located 978 km from Thon Buri railway station

Services 
 Super Express No. 45/46 Bangkok–Padang Besar–Bangkok
 Special Cross-Border Service No. 947/948 Hat Yai Junction–Padang Besar–Hat Yai Junction
 Special Cross-Border Service No. 949/950 Hat Yai Junction–Padang Besar–Hat Yai Junction

Former services
 Express Peninsular (KTM) No. 953/954 Hat Yai Junction–JB Sentral–Hat Yai Junction

References 
 
 

Railway stations in Thailand
Buildings and structures in Songkhla province